Emar Matha or Embar Mutt is a matha located in the south-eastern corner of Jagannath Temple, Puri outside the main Prakara near Kalikadevi Sahi.

This was one of the biggest and largest Mutt in Puri and Odisha which was demolished for beautification and need for space around the temple.
Biswanath Das (1911-1995) was one of the key figure associated with the Mutt and served the Mutt during Ramanuja II. A statesman and intellectual, he was an avid reader and had excellent command of Sanskrit, Odia and Bengali and is known to have read more than 1000 books that once were in the Mutt’s Raghunandan library, the oldest library of Puri before it was demolished for beautification project around the temple. People far from the Odisha state would visit him for consultation on legal matters. During his time with Mutt as advisor which he served for more than 60 years, three Mahants were made in those six decades. He used to reside in Daitapara Sahi, Puri.

History
Ramanujacharya while coming to Puri established this Mutt. It is said that Govindacharya (Govinda acharya) was the first pontif of this matha. Govindacharya was given the name Emperumannar, which means my lord in Tamil. Some of the disciples argued that if they call Govindacharya "my lord" then it may insult their Guru and Narayana, so Ramanuja changed his name to Embar.  Govindacharya was a cousin brother of Srimad Ramanuja, and he saved Ramanuja from Yadavaprakasha's conspiracy. The matha houses images of Krishna and Radha along with Rama parivaar.

Archaeology
The doorjambs of Emar mutt are noteworthy to see. It has all features of Kalingan architecture. The mutt was renovated during Maratha ruling on Orissa. The followers of this mutt belong to Thengalai sect of Srivaishnava sampradaya.

Approximately 18 tonnes of ancient silver treasure has been recovered from the mutt.

See also
Ramanuja
Ranganatha
Melkote

References

reports on Emar matha
treasure in Emar matha

Mathas in Puri